Jaume Albert Cuéllar Mendoza (born 23 August 2001) is a professional footballer who plays as either a winger or a forward for Spanish club CD Lugo and the Bolivia national team.

Club career

Early career
Born in Granollers, Barcelona, Catalonia to Bolivian parents, Cuéllar joined FC Barcelona's La Masia in June 2015, from FC Racing Blanenc. In 2017, he moved abroad and joined Italian side S.P.A.L.

S.P.A.L.
After appearing for the under-17s and the Primavera squads, Cuéllar made his first team debut for the Biancazzurri on 4 December 2019, coming on as a late substitute for Sergio Floccari in a 5–1 Coppa Italia home routing of Lecce. He made his Serie A debut the following 22 July, replacing Espeto late into a 1–6 home loss to Roma.

On 3 August 2021, Cuéllar announced his departure from SPAL through his Facebook account.

Lugo
On 4 August 2021, Cuéllar returned to Spain after agreeing to a two-year deal with Segunda División side CD Lugo.

International career
Cuéllar represented Bolivia at under-17 level in 2017, and received his first call-up to the full side on 4 October 2020. The following 10 June, he was included in César Farías' 27-man squad for the 2021 Copa América.

Cuéllar made his full international debut during the competition, starting against Paraguay. However, his debut didn't go to plan, as he was sent off, and Bolivia lost the match 3-1.

Career statistics

Club

Notes

International

References

External links

2001 births
Living people
Footballers from Granollers
People with acquired Bolivian citizenship
Bolivian footballers
Bolivia international footballers
Bolivia youth international footballers
Spanish footballers
Spanish people of Bolivian descent
Bolivian expatriate footballers
Spanish expatriate footballers
Association football wingers
Association football forwards
Serie A players
S.P.A.L. players
Segunda División players
CD Lugo players
2021 Copa América players
Spanish expatriate sportspeople in Italy
Bolivian expatriate sportspeople in Italy
Expatriate footballers in Italy